is an Echizen Railway Katsuyama Eiheiji Line railway station located in the city of Fukui, Fukui Prefecture, Japan.

Lines

Station layout
The station consists of one side platform connected to the station building by a level crossing, serving a single bi-directional track. The station is staffed only during the peak period of 7:00-10:00 and 16:00-20:00.

Adjacent stations

History
The station was opened on August 20, 1932. Operations were halted from June 25, 2001. The station reopened on July 20, 2003 as an Echizen Railway station. One of the tracks at the station was removed on September 27, 2015.

Surrounding area
The station is surrounded by apartment buildings, houses, and shops.
Other points of interest include:
  - Fukui Bypass
Fukui City Keimō Elementary School
Fukui Labor Standards Office
JOYFUL FUKUI Spa
Natural Hot Spring Gokurakuyū, Fukui Branch

See also
 List of railway stations in Japan

References

External links

  

Railway stations in Japan opened in 1932
Katsuyama Eiheiji Line
Fukui (city)